Trung Jered Canidate (born March 3, 1977) is a former American football running back in the NFL.  Drafted out of Arizona, Canidate was selected with the 31st overall pick of the 2000 NFL Draft by the St. Louis Rams.

Professional career

Pre-draft

The St. Louis Rams timed Canidate at 4.25 seconds in the 40-yard dash, more than .15 faster than his combine time. At the combine, Canidate did not complete his workout due to an ankle sprain.

St. Louis Rams
With the presence on the Rams' roster of Marshall Faulk, 1999 NFL Offensive MVP, there was much confusion with the selection of Canidate and most fans thought it was wasted.  He started only three games in his three seasons with St. Louis; he was drafted for his quickness and speed, but he was undersized and perceived as fumble-prone. He fumbled on 1.6% of his touches in his career, compared to a league average rate of 1.37% of touches).

Washington Redskins
After the 2002 season, St. Louis traded Canidate to the Washington Redskins for David Loverne and a fourth round draft choice.  There, he won the starting spot and started ten games, gaining 600 rushing yards and one touchdown.  The next season, the Redskins traded Champ Bailey for all-star running back Clinton Portis, and Canidate was released in June 2004.

NFL statistics

References

1977 births
Living people
American football running backs
Arizona Wildcats football players
St. Louis Rams players
Washington Redskins players
Players of American football from Phoenix, Arizona